The Alcoholic Beverage Control Board is an independent adjudicatory body of the District of Columbia, in the United States. Under Title 25 of the D.C. Official Code, the Board is responsible for overseeing the District's Alcoholic Beverage Regulation Administration and hiring its director, conducting investigations, the licensing process, handling complaints, keeping of records, and referral of evidence of criminal misconduct to the proper authorities.

The Board is composed of seven members, appointed by the Mayor of the District of Columbia and confirmed by the Council of the District of Columbia; their terms are for four years. The current chairman of the Board is Donovan Anderson.

References

External links

District Of Columbia
Government of the District of Columbia